Mait Lepik (born 23 September 1968 in Tallinn) is an Estonian actor.

Besides theatre roles he has played also in several Estonian and Finnish films, television series and advertisements.

Filmography
 1991: Rahu tänav (feature film)
 1991: Rist (feature film)
 2000: Me saame hakkama (television series)
 2006: Hundi agoonia (feature film)
 2011: Surnuaiavahi tütar (feature film)
 2017: Sangarid (feature film)

References

Living people
1968 births
Estonian male film actors
Estonian male stage actors
Estonian male television actors
20th-century Estonian male actors
21st-century Estonian male actors
Male actors from Tallinn